The Bone Clocks is a novel by British writer David Mitchell. It was long-listed for the Man Booker Prize 2014, and called one of the best novels of 2014 by Stephen King. The novel won the 2015 World Fantasy Award.

The novel is divided into six sections with five first-person  point-of-view narrators. They are loosely connected by the character of Holly Sykes, a young woman from Gravesend who is gifted with an "invisible eye" and semi-psychic abilities, and a war between two immortal factions, the Anchorites, who derive their immortality from murdering others, and the Horologists, who are naturally able to reincarnate.

The title refers to a derogatory term the immortal characters use for normal humans, who are doomed to mortality because of their aging bodies.

Plot
The book consists of six stories set during different times of Holly’s life.

A Hot Spell, 1984
Fifteen-year-old Holly Sykes runs away from home to live with her 24-year-old boyfriend. Before she leaves, her younger brother Jacko hands her a maze and tells her to memorize it. Arriving at her boyfriend's home, Holly finds him in bed with her best friend. She nevertheless decides to keep running away alone and meets Esther Little, an older woman who insists on giving her green tea in exchange for asylum. Holly consents to the strange offer, thinking the woman insane. Holly, who was once plagued by auditory hallucinations, then has a violent daymare involving her brother Jacko and several of the violent voices she recognizes from childhood. Afterwards she encounters Ed Brubeck, an acquaintance, who feeds  and helps shelter her. He talks about working on a strawberry farm in Kent. After securing the job by phone, Holly hitchhikes towards the farm. She is picked up by a young college-aged couple, Heidi and Ian, who believe in communism and take her to their home. After breakfast Holly washes up and then goes outside where she finds the couple dead. She is then attacked by a man called Rhîmes who mistakes her for Esther Little but soon comes to realize she has no powers at all. Rhîmes then tries to kill Holly but is stopped by the reanimated corpse of first Heidi and later Ian. Holly realizes that Ian is in fact Esther Little who has come to “claim sanctuary”. Esther embeds herself in Holly's brain but erases the incident from her memory.

Holly makes her way to the strawberry farm. While there she hears the news of Heidi and Ian's death but is unable to connect it with herself. She meets a young woman called Gwyn who says  she too was once a runaway, and that unless her home situation is violently bad, she should return. While Holly is considering it, Ed Brubeck arrives having guessed where she is and tells her she needs to return home as Jacko is missing and the police are not treating the case seriously as they believe he is with Holly.

Myrrh Is Mine, Its Bitter Perfume, 1991
Hugo Lamb, an amoral politics student at the fictional Humber College, Cambridge, encounters a beautiful woman who calls herself Immaculée Constantin at a choir rehearsal, who tells him that immortality is possible. Hugo then blacks out for two hours. At a local pub, he re-encounters Elijah D'Arnoq, a New Zealander he met in his first year, and persuades the aristocratic Jonny Penhaligon to join a poker match at the end of term. A fight breaks out between Richard Cheeseman, an aspiring novelist and critic, and a local band he criticized in print, which ends with Hugo threatening to take the band to court for grievous bodily harm, and stealing away the current girlfriend of his friend Olly.

Hugo has created a second bank account under the false identity of Marcus Anyder, an Astrophysics student at Imperial College London, and has acquired nearly £50,000 through various illicit deeds, including selling his mentor's vintage stamps as he recovers from a stroke, and cheating his friends at cards. His newest scheme involves manipulating Jonny into selling his father's Aston Martin Coda to a vintage car dealer he knows. Jonny, having lost over £15,000 through gambling and with his once prestigious family already deeply in debt, reluctantly agrees. A homeless man he gives money to in Piccadilly Circus follows him home and claims to be Immaculée Constantin. Hugo persuades himself that the encounters were his own imagination. He then goes to Switzerland for the Christmas holidays where an attractive bar manager, Holly Sykes, catches his eye, and he tries to win her over with some small degree of success. On 30 December, he receives a call from Cheeseman, who informs him that Jonny has committed suicide by driving his father's Aston off a cliff, with an inquest forthcoming.

On New Year's Eve, annoyed by his friends picking up women he suspects to be prostitutes and rattled by accusations of theft and fraud, Hugo rings in the New Year at the bar Holly works at. In the morning, he receives a call from his father telling him that the police are looking for him, which he suspects is related to his most recent theft of vintage stamps. Furthermore, the women his friends slept with summon their pimps to the house in order to shake them down for money. Hugo manages to escape through the window of his room and runs into Holly, who warns him of an imminent whiteout coming. He stays overnight in her home and learns about her missing brother Jacko, who never resurfaced. He bluntly tells her to stop blaming herself for her brother’s death, and while stunned, the two later sleep together. Hugo, for the first time, falls in love, but discovers a postcard from Ed Brubeck, currently travelling around the world, and grows jealous. The morning after, Holly departs for work, telling Hugo she will have no hard feelings if he decides to leave. He goes to see her at the bar, but before he can he is intercepted by D'Arnoq and his companion, Baptiste Pfenninger. They invite him into their car, warning him there will be no turning back. Deciding that he has no chance of a long relationship with Holly and wary of the potential prosecution awaiting him back home, Hugo accepts. On the journey, D'Arnoq and Pfenninger tell him that they, along with Immaculée Constantin, are Anchorites, a group capable of telepathy as well as putting people on "hiatus" (i.e., causing time gaps and memory loss) and stopping the ageing process. Having vetted Hugo and finding him devious and amoral, they invite him to join.

The Wedding Bash, 2004
Ed Brubeck, now a 35-year-old war journalist, returns to England for Holly's younger sister's wedding. A war junkie, he had initially planned to move back to London to settle down with Holly and their six-year-old daughter Aoife, while secretly planning to return to Baghdad instead. While out for a walk he and Aoife encounter Immaculée Constantin who checks to see if Aoife has an invisible eye as her mother once did and, finding she does not, disappears.

During the wedding Ed is lost in the memories of his time in Iraq working with Aziz and Nassar, two Iraqis who take him into territory dangerous for foreigners and help him with interviews and photos. After dropping him off at his hotel they are murdered by a suicide bomber targeting the hotel where the foreign-born journalists live. Ed feels intense guilt over their deaths.

Ed strikes up a conversation with Holly's great aunt Eilish, who lives in a remote part of Ireland called Sheep's Head. She confesses something she's never told the rest of the family: she believes that Holly's little brother Jacko is not who he appears to be. Similarly to the 'changeling' myth, she thinks he returned from his near-fatal hospitalization as a different person. Ed is unsure how to react to this information.

After the wedding, settling down with Aoife for a nap, Ed is awakened by Holly and realizes that Aoife has gone missing. The two split up to find her with Ed going to the Brighton Pier believing Aoife has gone in search of a fortune-teller she saw earlier, Dwight Silverwind. Silverwind has not seen Aoife but goes with Ed back to the hotel to try to find her. When they arrive Holly has a fit during which she intones the words "ten" and "fifteen". Silverwind suggests Holly might be psychic, something Ed noticed in Holly before but never previously believed. However he grabs the room key to 1015 and goes there where he finds Aoife. He makes up a story for the rest of Holly's family about how he was able to find Aoife but tells Holly the truth.

Crispin Hershey’s Lonely Planet, 2015
From 2015 to 2020, author Crispin Hershey, once a literary wunderkind, sees his fortunes decline. His latest novel has not sold well thanks to a brutally unfavourable review by Richard Cheeseman, now an established critic; he is estranged from his Canadian wife and two young daughters; and at a book fair, he is upstaged by new author Holly Sykes who has written an immensely popular book about her psychic visions called The Radio People. Crispin also encounters a young Asian-American woman who introduces herself as Soleil Moore and hands him a book of her poetry which he promptly trashes. At a literary festival in Colombia, Crispin decides to get his revenge on Cheeseman by putting cocaine in his suitcase and phoning in a tip. Only intending to humiliate him, he is horrified when Cheeseman is sentenced to six years in Colombian prison for drug trafficking.

As Crispin tours the globe, attracting less and less of an audience and gathering more debt, he encounters Holly again several times, becoming more persuaded with each encounter that she is not lying about her abilities. While on Rottnest Island with Holly and a teenage Aoife, Crispin witnesses Holly appear to have an epileptic seizure, where she speaks in what he believes to be an Australian Aboriginal language. In Shanghai, she correctly predicts the results of a coin toss ten times in a row, astonishing Crispin. She also warns him that whenever she is near him she thinks of "A spider, a spiral, a one-eyed man." He also receives another book from Soleil which he also disposes of.

As the years pass, Crispin and Holly grow close and become good friends. On a trip to visit her in Iceland, he is attacked by the now-immortal Hugo Lamb who interrogates him about Holly, Esther Little, and what she knows about Horologists and Anchorites. Finding Crispin's answers satisfactory, Hugo then wipes his memory, but not before hinting of telling Cheeseman that Crispin put him in prison. Later during the trip, Crispin learns Holly has cancer and likely has very little time to live. A new doctor, named Iris Fenby, wants Holly to try an experimental new treatment. Crispin starts a brief relationship with Holly's Spanish-language agent, one that later results in a son.

By 2020 Crispin, now heavily in debt, is teaching at an Ivy League college (fictional, but resembling Bard College) in the Hudson Valley, New York. He is visited by the newly released Cheeseman, now wearing an eyepatch. Crispin believes him to be the one-eyed man of Holly's prophecy. Cheeseman confronts him and tells him he spent his time in jail fantasising about killing Crispin, but at the climactic moment, he decides not to, and leaves.  Just afterwards, Crispin is visited by Soleil Moore, whom he does not remember, and who is horrified that he still has not read the works she gave him. She tells him he is part of "the Script" and that humans are being used and abused by higher beings, and she hoped Crispin would help her publish her works so this would become widespread knowledge. She then goes to her Plan B and shoots Crispin, knowing that the murder will make her and her work infamous. Before he dies, Crispin sees spirals on the carpet, a dead spider between a filing cabinet and the wall, and a toy pirate with an eye patch, thus fulfilling Holly's prophecy.

An Horologist’s Labyrinth, 2025
In 2025 Marinus begins to receive messages from Esther Little, who she had previously believed dead. Marinus is a being who has reincarnated into many bodies, including the doctor who once cured Holly of her "radio people" as a child and the doctor who helped put Holly's cancer into remission under the name Iris Fenby. Through Esther's messages Marinus realizes that Esther Little has been stowed away inside of Holly's memories since 1984.

Marinus (in her current form as Iris Fenby) contacts Holly and reveals herself to be part of a group of "atemporals" who call themselves Horologists. Horologists are beings who are naturally immortal, and either come back 49 days after the death of their previous host body into the body of a child who was already dying, or are able to transfer their souls into dying children when new bodies wear out. The Horologists' reincarnation processes are natural and harm no one, unlike their enemies, the Anchorites, who achieve their immortality by draining the souls of psychically gifted children into something called "Black Wine", which halts the ageing process. In one final revelation, Marinus explains that Holly's brother, Jacko, was in fact an atemporal leader called Xi Lo, inhabiting Jacko's body, and the child's seeming disappearance was actually due to Xi Lo falling in battle during the Horologist's first mission in 1984.

Holly is naturally skeptical, but after she is almost killed by a group of Anchorites she decides to work with Marinus and the Horologists. Marinus is able to locate Esther in Holly's memory and extract her by saying her 'long name', which is a compilation of all the names she has ever had throughout her various lifetimes. They then make a plan to go to the Chapel of the Blind Cathar in order to try to destroy its icon and thus the source of the Anchorites' power. The Blind Cathar, a heretic monk who willed the Chapel of the Dusk into being and has since become one with it, is the source of the Anchorites' rituals, and to destroy him and the temple would end their ability to prey on mortals.

Believing that Xi Lo / Jacko may have survived the battle in 1984 and still be hiding in the temple, Holly accompanies them. The Horologists engage in a "psychosoteric" war with the Anchorites that kills many of the Horologists but manages to buy Esther Little enough time to destroy the Blind Cathar. Marinus' body is destroyed, but she climbs inside Holly's mind and is able to protect her this way. As the chapel is crumbling around them, an opening appears and Holly goes through it. She realizes the space is actually the maze Jacko gave her in 1984 and asked her to memorize, and is able to find her way through. Along the way, she and Marinus are stopped by Immaculée Constantin, who threatens to destroy them with her mental powers. Marinus manages to distract her long enough for Holly to club her with a rolling pin. At the centre of the maze is a golden apple. Marinus leaves Holly's mind and asks her to touch it, transporting her to safety. Marinus realizes she has been left behind with Hugo Lamb, who admits that the reason he did not take the golden apple himself and leave Holly to die was because he truly loved Holly during their brief encounter together. Just as they are about to die, Marinus realizes there is another possible way for them to escape.

Sheep’s Head, 2043
Holly is now living in her great-aunt's house in Sheep's Head, Ireland. It has been five years since a period called the Endarkenment, during which climate change brought about a depletion of resources, and people are now forced to live off the land combined with government rationing. Holly is taking care of her teenage granddaughter Lorelei, orphaned after the death of her parents in a plane crash, and an orphaned young boy called Rafiq. Despite the fact that the rest of Europe is suffering terribly, Ireland is relatively stable due to the fact that the Chinese have brokered a deal with them, giving them oil and sporadic internet usage in return for leasing some of their land.  However, the Chinese abruptly pull their resources and, despite promises that the Irish government will be able to keep things stable, a mixture of rogue government troops and militiamen invade the town, taking solar panels and oil. Over an argument on how to split their resources, the invaders begin shooting at each other, sparing most of the locals and leaving them time to form a small militia of their own.

Back at Holly's home, a military vessel arrives asking for Holly Sykes by name. The vessel reveals that it is from Iceland, where law and order still prevails, and has been sent to repatriate Lorelei, whose father was from Iceland. One of the crew members is revealed to be the reincarnated Marinus. Holly asks him to use his powers of mind control to take Rafiq with Lorelei as he is diabetic and his insulin is running out. Marinus reveals that he has just enough skill to get the Icelandic soldiers to take both Lorelei and Rafiq with him, but Holly must be left behind. Holly says goodbye to her grandchildren, knowing she will likely never see them in person again, but resigned to her fate if it gives Lorelei and Rafiq a new beginning at life.

Characters
Holly Sykes: the daughter of publicans who was once plagued by what she thought were auditory hallucinations. 
Hugo Lamb: an amoral university student who is recruited into the Anchorites.
Ed Brubeck: a classmate of Holly's from Gravesend who later becomes her partner.
Crispin Hershey: a petty middle-aged novelist who finds it difficult to accept that he is no longer as successful as he used to be. 
Marinus: an atemporal being who is reincarnated into new bodies each time her old one dies.  
Immaculée Constantin: an Anchorite who visits Holly as a young girl and who inducts Hugo Lamb into the Anchorites.
Jacko Sykes: Holly's little brother who is actually the reincarnated form of Xi Lo.

Allusions/references to other works
The Bone Clocks contains characters from other works by Mitchell, following precedents set in his earlier novels.  In interviews leading up to the release of this novel, Mitchell described this shared universe as an "uber-novel".
 Early on in the novel (around the first appearance of Marinus), a Chinese restaurant by the name of A Thousand Autumns is mentioned.  
 Hugo Lamb, one of the novel’s narrators, appears as a boy in Black Swan Green, in which he is the protagonist Jason Taylor's cousin. The character Alan Wall also appears in Black Swan Green.
 There are mentions of Spyglass Magazine and the writer Felix Finch, both featured in Cloud Atlas and Utopia Avenue.
 Crispin Hershey, another of the novel's narrators, is ostensibly the author of The Voorman Problem, an excerpt from number9dream, as well as the writer of a work whose plot seems identical to "The Siphoners", a short story written by David Mitchell, which in turns seems to be the same pre-apocalyptic universe described in the last section of the book. He is also briefly mentioned in Slade House and appears as a child in Utopia Avenue. 
 The soul of Dr. Marinus from The Thousand Autumns of Jacob de Zoet is revealed to be capable of reincarnation, and is another of the novel’s narrators, mostly as Dr. Iris Fenby. This particular incarnation of Marinus actually appeared in David Mitchell’s libretto for Michel Van der Aa's opera Sunken Garden, which David Mitchell said served as a "prologue" to The Bone Clocks.  Marinus, as Dr. Iris Fenby, also appears in Slade House and he appears in Utopia Avenue, alongside Esther Little.
 Jonny Penhaligon is implied to be a descendant of Captain Penhaligon of the British frigate Phoebus in The Thousand Autumns of Jacob de Zoet. Jonny's sister Fern appears as a minor character in Slade House. There is also an Izzy Penhaligon in Utopia Avenue with whom Dean Moss has a one-night stand.
 Elijah D’Arnoq, another "Atemporal" like Dr. Marinus, is also from the Chatham Islands, like the Mr. D'Arnoq  in the first segment of Cloud Atlas.  The Afterword which appears in the paperback version reveals that Elijah is Mr. D’Arnoq’s son. 
 Mo Muntervary, a physicist who first appeared in Ghostwritten, is a secondary character in the last of this novel's sections.
 The Prophetess, the schooner that appears in the first and third Cloud Atlas narratives, is the same vessel that Marinus remembers taking to Australia.
 The Chetwynd-Pitt family, whom Hugo Lamb stays with in Switzerland, reappears in Slade House.
 In the final section of the novel, Marinus mentions that the surviving Horologists have founded an organization called "Prescience", which is likely connected to the Prescients in the distant future portion of Cloud Atlas, who serve the same function of preserving technology and medicine in a savage, post-apocalyptic future.

References

External links
 Map of Holly's journey
 Review of The Bone Clocks by Rose Harris-Birtill for Foundation: The International Review of Science Fiction 44.1. 120 (June 2015): 131–34.

2014 British novels
Novels by David Mitchell
World Fantasy Award for Best Novel-winning works
Novels set in Ireland
Fiction set in 1984
Fiction set in 1991
Fiction set in 2004
Fiction set in 2015
Fiction set in 2025
Fiction set in 2043
Novels set in Kent
Sceptre (imprint) books
Novels set in Iraq